The Al-Rahmah Mosque or Fatima Al-Zahra Mosque is a mosque in Jeddah, Mecca Province, Saudi Arabia.

History
The mosque was established in 1985.

Architecture
The mosque covers an area of 2,400 m2. It consists of one main dome and 52 outer domes, 23 external umbrellas and 56 windows designed in Islamic style.

See also
 Islam in Saudi Arabia
 List of mosques in Saudi Arabia

References

External links

1985 establishments in Saudi Arabia
Rahmah Mosque
Rahmah Mosque